Woodlands Secondary School is a secondary school in Northdale, Pietermaritzburg, KwaZulu-Natal, South Africa.

External links

Buildings and structures in Pietermaritzburg
Educational institutions established in 1902
1902 establishments in South Africa
High schools in South Africa
Schools in KwaZulu-Natal